Clitoral vibrators are vibrators designed to externally stimulate a woman's clitoris for her sexual pleasure and orgasm. They are sex toys created for massaging the clitoris, and are not penetrating sex toys, although the shape of some vibrators allows for penetration and the stimulation of inner erogenous zones for extra sexual pleasure. Regardless of the design, the main function of the clitoral vibrator is to vibrate at varying speeds and intensities. Vibrators are normally driven by batteries and some of them can be used underwater.

Discretion is often a useful feature for a sex toy, so clitoral vibrators that look like ordinary objects at first glance are also available. Clitoral vibrators have been designed to resemble lipsticks, mobile telephones, sponges, and many other everyday items.

Types 

Most vibrators can be used for clitoral stimulation, but there are a few distinct types of vibrator available:

 Manual clitoral vibrators come in a wide variety of designs. Some wand vibrators (such as the Hitachi Magic Wand and the Doxy) are powered by a long cable to a wall socket, making them somewhat less convenient, and unsafe in a wet environment. However, they are generally powerful, offering more intense stimulation and better durability. There are also battery operated vibrators, as well as small ones that can be worn on a finger, and used for couples' play.
 Hands-free clitoral vibrators are generally smaller, less powerful devices held in place by straps or a harness. The most common ones are small, egg-shaped and attached to a multi-speed battery pack by a long cord. They may be remotely controlled. Butterfly strap-ons, vibrating panties, and cock rings are types of hands-free clitoral vibrators.
 Butterfly strap-ons are small vibrators with adjustable straps on the wearer's waist and hips.
 Vibrating panties are panties with an extra pouch in front into which a small vibrator is placed. They are usually remote controlled, such as via an app on a mobile device, and can be worn outside of the home, such as in an office, car, etc. The remote control can be entrusted to the wearer's partner, but its range is limited, and the vibrator can also be remotely controlled via an app installed on both mobile devices. However, these vibrators are not silent, producing an audible humming sound when active.
 Cock rings feature a vibrating bullet, to stimulate the clitoris during intercourse, as well as an erection enhancer.

Some hands-free vibrators are waterproof.

There are also dual type of vibrators which provide stimulation to both the clitoris and G-spot. Some clitoral vibrators may be inserted into the vagina. These typically have a small arm near the base of the vibrator, providing simultaneous clitoral and vaginal stimulation. Variations include vibrators shaped like narrow bullets, animals, ergonomic forms, miniature rockets and large human tongues.

See also 
 Anal vibrator
 Clitoral pump
 G-spot vibrator
Hitachi Magic Wand
 Love egg
 Rabbit vibrator
 Waterproof vibrator

References 

Female sex toys
Vibrators